Rattling Run is a tributary of Catawissa Creek in Schuylkill County, Pennsylvania, in the United States. The stream is considered to be a High-Quality Coldwater Fishery and Class A Wild Trout Waters. Three species of fish inhabit the stream. The main rock formations in the stream's watershed are the Mauch Chunk Formation and the Pottsville Formation and the main soils are the Leck Kill soil and the Hezleton soil. The stream has two unnamed tributaries.

Course

Rattling Run begins on the southern border of Brandonville in East Union Township. It flows north and slightly west, reaching the central part of Brandonville after several tenths of a mile. It then turns west and slightly south and enters a valley. After more than a mile, the stream turns north-northwest and then north-northeast, crossing Pennsylvania Route 339. After crossing Pennsylvania Route 339, it turns west-northwest and reaches its confluence with Catawissa Creek after several tenths of a mile.

Tributaries
Rattling Run has no named tributaries. However, it does have two unnamed tributaries, known as "Trib 27594 To Rattling Run" and "Trib 27595 To Rattling Run".

Hydrology
Rattling Run is infertile and acidic. It has the potential to be affected by acid precipitation.

The concentration of alkalinity in Rattling Run is 5 milligrams per liter. The pH of the stream is 6.6. Its total concentration of water hardness is 22 milligrams per liter.

The specific conductivity of the waters of the stream is 81 umhos.

Geography and geology

Rattling Run flows over rock of the Mauch Chunk Formation for its entire length. This rock formation consists of siltstone, sandstone, grayish-red shale, and conglomerate. The Pottsville Formation is also found in the southern part of the watershed. The lower reaches of the watershed of the stream are on Leck Kill soil. The upper reaches are on Hazleton soil.

It has a high gradient of 33.0 meters per kilometer.

There are few areas in the vicinity of Rattling Run that are prone to flooding during a 100 year flood. The valley of the stream is narrow and mostly forested.

Watershed
Most of the watershed is in North Union Township, with a portion of it being in East Union Township. Smaller portions of the watershed are in Mahanoy Township and West Mahanoy Township.

Some agricultural land is located in the watershed of Rattling Run. There is a police station or fire station at the stream's headwaters. 25 percent of the stream's length is within  of a road and 42 percent is within  of one. 56 percent of the stream is within  of a road.

Rattling Run is in the United States Geological Survey quadrangle of Shenandoah.

Biology
Rattling Run is considered by the Pennsylvania Department of Environmental Protection to be a High-Quality Coldwater Fishery, although it has not always had this designation but instead was considered to be a Coldwater Fishery in the past. Additionally, it is considered by the Pennsylvania Fish and Boat Commission to be Class A Wild Trout Waters.

Three species of fish inhabit Rattling Run. They are brook trout, eastern blacknose dace, and sculpins.

The biomass of wild brook trout in Rattling Run is 56.64 kilograms per hectare. This includes 35.30 kilograms per hectare of brook trout that are less than 175 millimeters long and 21.34 kilograms per hectare of brook trout that are more than 175 millimeters long. The brook trout in the stream range from 25 to 224 millimeters in length. There are 819 brook trout per kilometer that are less than 175 millimeters long and 94 per kilometer that are more than 175 millimeters long. There are 2729 brook trout per hectare that are less than 175 millimeters long and 314 per hectare that are more than 175 millimeters long.

A 1997 report stated that Rattling Run was an excellent site for angling.

See also
Dark Run, next tributary of Catawissa Creek going downstream
Davis Run, next tributary of Catawissa Creek going upstream
List of tributaries of Catawissa Creek

References

External links
Map of the Catawissa Creek watershed

Rivers of Schuylkill County, Pennsylvania
Tributaries of Catawissa Creek
Rivers of Pennsylvania